Paul Chester Hoover (born April 14, 1976) is an American professional baseball coach and former catcher. He is currently the bench coach for the Kansas City Royals of Major League Baseball (MLB). Hoover played in MLB for the Tampa Bay Devil Rays, Florida Marlins, and the Philadelphia Phillies.

Professional career

Tampa Bay Devil Rays
In 1994 Hoover was drafted by the Houston Astros in the 64th round of the MLB draft, however he did not sign. Hoover was drafted by the Tampa Bay Devil Rays in the 23rd round (714th overall) of the 1997 MLB draft, with whom he signed on June 6, 1997. Hoover made his MLB debut on September 8, 2001, as a pinch hitter for Tampa Bay in a game against the Oakland Athletics; he singled to left field in his first MLB plate appearance.  Hoover appeared in three games with Tampa Bay during 2001, and in five games during 2002.

Florida Marlins
Hoover next played in the major leagues in 2006, with the Florida Marlins.  From 2006 through 2008, he appeared in a total of 20 games for the Marlins. On September 29, 2007, Hoover broke up a potential no-hitter in the eighth inning with an infield single to spoil a bid by John Maine of the New York Mets.

Philadelphia Phillies
On January 7, 2009, Hoover signed a minor league contract with an invitation to spring training with the Philadelphia Phillies. He appeared in a total of 12 major league games with the Phillies during 2009–2010. On October 4, 2009, Hoover hit a walk-off RBI single on the final day of the regular season against the Florida Marlins to give the Phillies a 7–6 victory. He was outrighted to Triple-A Lehigh Valley on October 28, 2010.

Boston Red Sox
In February 2011, Hoover signed a minor league contract with the Boston Red Sox, however he did not play for their organization during the 2011 regular season.

Hoover currently holds the MLB record for most seasons by a non-pitcher with 25 or fewer plate appearances, with six.  He shares the record for the most seasons as a rookie, with seven seasons.

Post-playing career
In 2012, the Tampa Bay Rays hired Hoover as manager for the rookie-level Gulf Coast League Rays. The team finished with a 28–32 record. In 2013, Hoover became a roving catching coordinator for Tampa Bay. In December 2018, Hoover was named the field coordinator for the Rays, replacing Rocco Baldelli, who became manager of the Minnesota Twins.

Personal life
Both of Hoover's parents are deaf; he learned American Sign Language at a young age.

References

External links
, or Retrosheet

1976 births
Living people
Albuquerque Isotopes players
American expatriate baseball players in Canada
Baseball coaches from Ohio
Baseball players from Columbus, Ohio
Charleston RiverDogs players
Edmonton Trappers players
Florida Marlins players
Durham Bulls players
Gulf Coast Marlins players
Hudson Valley Renegades players
Lehigh Valley IronPigs players
Major League Baseball catchers
Major League Baseball coaches
Minor league baseball coaches
Minor league baseball managers
Orlando Rays players
Philadelphia Phillies players
Princeton Devil Rays players
St. Petersburg Devil Rays players
Tampa Bay Devil Rays players
Tampa Bay Rays coaches
Azucareros del Este players
American expatriate baseball players in the Dominican Republic